The following is a list of most watched Canadian television broadcasts of 1985 (single-network only) according to Nielsen.

Most watched by week

References

Canadian television-related lists
1985 in Canadian television